Pushpendra Singh (born 18 May 1970) is an Indian politician who was a Minister in the BJP led Rajasthan Government. He is a member of the Rajasthan Legislative Assembly elected from Bali (Rajasthan Assembly constituency) in Pali district in Rajasthan state. He has won all of the assembly elections in this district since 2003, winning his fourth term in 2018. He has been elected on the ticket of the Bharatiya Janata Party.

Family
Pushpendra Singh was born on 18 May 1970 in Rajasthan. His father was the late Narendra Singh.

Education
He completed graduation from Maharaja Sayajirao University of Baroda. He also has a degree in Philosophy.

Award
Pushpendra Singh Ranawat Awarded by Narendra Modi on 15 Feb. 2015 for outstanding performance in PROMOTION OF RENEWABLE ENERGY.

Political life
At a young age (29), Singh was elected as pradhan. Following that, he was elected five times as a member of the Rajasthan Legislative Assembly.

1993 elected as President Gram Seva Sehkari Samiti.
2000 to 2002 - 13 February 2014, elected as pradhan, Bali Panchyat Samiti.
2002 to 2003 - elected as MLA from Bali Seat by election in 2002 after Bhairon Singh Shekhawat became vice President of India
2003 to 2008 - elected as MLA from Bali Seat in Rajasthan Legislative Assembly election, 2003
2008 to 2013 - elected as MLA from Bali Seat 2008 Rajasthan Legislative Assembly election
2013 to 2018 -  elected as MLA from Bali Seat 2013 Rajasthan Legislative Assembly election and was appointed Energy Minister in Rajasthan Cabinet of Mrs. Vasundhara Raje Scindhia
 2014 - 2015 Member, Committee on Estimates "B" (2014-2015)
 2014 - 2015 Member, Business Advisory Committee (2014-2015)
2018 to present - elected as MLA from Bali Seat 2018 Rajasthan Legislative Assembly election

See also
List of ministers in Government of Rajasthan

References

rajassembly

Living people
Rajasthani politicians
People from Pali district
1970 births
Rajasthan MLAs 2003–2008
Rajasthan MLAs 2008–2013
Rajasthan MLAs 2018–2023
Bharatiya Janata Party politicians from Rajasthan